In the field of comparative religion, many scholars, academics, and religious figures have looked at the relationships between Hinduism and other religions.

Indian religions

Ayyavazhi

Ayyavazhi and Hinduism are two belief systems in India. Though Ayyavazhi continues to officially exist within Hinduism and is considered by some observers to be a Hindu denomination, members of the religion claim that it is independent. The most notable distinction from Hindu are the Ayyavazhi religion's concepts of good, evil and dharma.

Hindus view Vedas, Gita, and other texts from the Shastra as canonical scriptures, instead of the Akilam. The Ayyavazhi believe that the Hindu scriptures were once canonical, but now have lost their Substance because of the advent of Akilam. Kaliyan bought the Vedas as a Boon and so all the previous religious books including Agamas and Puranas lost their Substances, leaving Akilattirattu Ammanai as the only book of perfection. Several dubious claims state that the present day Vedas are not accepted by Ayyavazhi as books of Perfection, because there is a quote in Akilam about Venneesan "Avan pilathaal  vedamondruntakki" (He created a Veda of his own intention). All previous religious texts have lost their Substance in the vision of Ayyavazhi at the very moment Kaliyan came to the world.

Though Ayyavazhi has many differences from popular Hinduism, it has many beliefs and practices in common. As Hinduism is really a tree of many branches, Ayyavazhi is closest to Smartism and its Advaita beliefs in thought.

Buddhism

Buddhism and Hinduism  have common origins in the Ganges culture of northern India during the "second urbanisation" around 500 BCE. They have shared parallel beliefs that have existed side by side, but also pronounced differences.

Buddhism attained prominence in the Indian subcontinent as it was supported by royal courts, but started to decline after the Gupta era and virtually disappeared from India in the 11th century CE, except in some pockets. It has continued to exist outside of India and has become the major religion in several Asian countries.

Hinduism and Buddhism originated in Northern India, but later expanded throughout Asia.

Jainism

Hinduism and Jainism have a rather similar view on the topic of asceticism, or, in simpler terms, abstinence. It is thought that their beliefs on the topic come from the early belief that some meditative and monastic practices cleanse the body of impurity. The Hindu theory of Karma gave Jainism a great deal of support to start promoting asceticism. Both of these traditions attribute human greed, hatred, and delusion to the presence of impure residues (samskaras or vasanas) that must be cleansed as the individual person moves towards "freedom" (death). Both of these religions believe that practicing asceticism is not only to the benefit of the individual but also to the benefit of the society as a whole. Nonviolence plays a large role in both of these religions so the concept of asceticism relies greatly on both of their beliefs.

Sikhism

The historical interaction between Sikhism and Hinduism occurred because both were founded on the Indian subcontinent and have the majority of their followers there.

Abrahamic religions

Christianity

History
There has been some debate on historical connections between Christianity and Indian religion, it has focused on both Buddhism (via Greco-Buddhism) as well as Hinduism. While it is evident that a number of Indian sages visited Constantinople in Classical Antiquity, claims of significant influence in either direction have failed to gain wide acceptance. Christianity revolves heavily around the life of Jesus Christ as detailed in the Bible, whereas Hinduism is not based on any one personality or one book, but rather on the philosophy that there is a god, or no god and just self, etc. Nevertheless, some scholars have studied whether there are links between the story of Jesus and that of Krishna; "Krishnology" is a term coined to express these claimed theological parallels between Krishnaism and the Christological dogmas of Christianity.

Although little is known of the immediate growth of the church, Bar-Daisan (154–223 CE) reports that in his time there were Christian tribes in North India which claimed to have been converted by Thomas and to have books and relics to prove it.

Contemporary Christian-Hindu relations are a mixed affair. Hinduism's historical tendency has been to recognize the divine basis of various other religions, and to revere their founders and saintly practitioners; this continues today. The declaration Nostra aetate by the Second Vatican Council officially established inter-religious dialogue between Catholics and Hindus, promoting common values between the two religions (among others). There are over 17.3 million Catholics in India, which represents less than 2% of the total population, still making it the largest Christian church in India. 
(See also: Dalit theology).

Doctrine
Buddhism, Hinduism and Christianity differ on fundamental beliefs on heaven, hell and reincarnation, to name a few. From the Hindu perspective, heaven (Sanskrit: swarga) and hell (naraka) are temporary places, where every soul has to live, either for the good deeds done or for their sins committed. After a soul suffers its due punishment in hell, or after a soul has enjoyed enough in heaven, it again enters the life-death cycle. There is no concept in Hinduism of a permanent hell like that in Christianity; rather, the cycle of "karma" takes over. Permanent heaven or bliss is "moksha".

Indian philosopher Sarvepalli Radhakrishnan, wrote: 

The Holy Trinity of Christianity, consisting of the Father, Son, and Holy Spirit, is sometimes seen as roughly analogous to the Trimurti of Hinduism, whose members—Brahma, Vishnu, and Shiva—are seen as the three principal manifestations of Brahman, or Godhead. The specific formulation of this trinitarian relationship is not identical between the two religions; for example, in Hinduism there is a Parabrahma, or an ultimate creator who created the Trimurti, for which there exists no parallel in Christianity. Some consider Brahma to be more similar to the demiurge of Christian gnosticism, in that he (at least initially) wrongly thought himself as the "Creator" and also as the highest or even the only god. In this case, the Hindu version of the Trinity could be seen as Brahma (Father), Sankarshan or Vishnu (Holy spirit), and Mahesh or Shiva (Son; analogous to Christ).

There have been Christian writers such as the 17th century mystic Jane Leade and the 19th-20th century theologian Sergei Bulgakov, who have described the feminine Sophia (wisdom) as an aspect of the Godhead. This may serve as a rough analogue to Hinduism's description of Sita in the Ramayana, who is saved by Hanuman (an incarnation of Shiva) from the demon king Ravana to be reunited with her husband Rama, representing God. Nevertheless, although the concept that we can come to know God through sophia has played a role in Christian thought, no major Christian denominations profess Sophia as an independent aspect of God.

In Hinduism (also in Jainism and Sikhism), the concept of moksha is akin to that of Buddhism's nirvana, but some scholars further claim that it is akin as well to Christianity's doctrine of salvation. Hindu sannyasi Swami Tripurari states:... in theory the sinners of the world are the beneficiaries of Christ’s sacrifice, but it is God the father for whose pleasure Christ underwent the crucifixion, even when the father’s joy in this scenario lies in the salvation of sinners. Christ represents the intermediary between God and humanity, and his life aptly illustrates the fact that it is sacrifice by which we come to meet our maker. Thus in Christ the Divine teaches us “the way” more than he does the goal. The Christ conception represents “the way” in the sense that the way is sacrifice, out of which love arises. The Krishna conception represents that for which we not only should, but must sacrifice, compelled by the Godhead’s irresistible attributes, etc. depicted therein.

The Christian Ashram Movement, a movement within Christianity in India, embraces Vedanta and the teachings of the East, attempting to combine the Christian faith with the Hindu ashram model, and Christian monasticism with the Hindu sannyasa tradition. In Western countries, Vedanta has influenced some Christian thinkers (see also: Pierre Johanns, Abhishiktananda, Bede Griffiths), while others in the anti-cult movement have reacted against the activities of immigrant gurus and their followers.

Among the Malbars of the French island Réunion, a syncretism of Catholicism and Hinduism can develop.
Krishna Janmashtami, the birth day of Krishna, is considered to be the date of birth of Jesus Christ.
Mariamman is worshiped as the Virgin Mary.
Saint Expeditus is identified with goddess Kali.

Islam

Hindu–Islamic relations began when Islamic influence first came to be found in the Indian subcontinent during the early 7th century. Hinduism and Islam are two of the world’s four largest religions. Hinduism is the socio-religious way of life of the Hindu people of the Indian subcontinent, their diaspora, and some other regions which had Hindu influence in the ancient and medieval times. Islam is a strictly monotheistic religion in which the supreme deity is Allah ( : see God in Islam), the last Islamic prophet being Muhammad ibn Abdullah, whom Muslims believe delivered the Islamic scripture, the Quran. Hinduism mostly shares common terms with the other Indian religions, including Buddhism, Jainism and Sikhism. Islam shares common characteristics with Abrahamic religions–those religions claiming descent from the prophet Abraham–being, from oldest to youngest, Judaism, Christianity, Islam.

The Qur'an is the primary Islamic scripture. Muslims believe it to be the verbatim, uncreated word of Allah. Second to this in religious authority, and whence many practices of Islam derive, especially for Sunnis, are the Sunni six major collections of hadīth, which are traditional records of the sayings and acts of Muhammad. The scriptures of Hinduism are the Shrutis (the four Vedas, which comprise the original Vedic Hymns, or Samhitas, and three tiers of commentaries upon the Samhitas, namely the Brahmanas, Aranyakas and Upanishads); Furthermore, Hinduism is also based on the Smritis (including the Rāmāyana, the Bhagavad Gītā [part of the Mahabharata cycle], and the Purānas), which are considered to be of secondary authority and of human creation of sages but the 18 Puranas.

Judaism

Hinduism and Judaism are amongst the oldest existing religions in the world. They have shared a notable relationship throughout historical and modern times.

Other religions

Baháʼí Faith

Hinduism is recognized in the Baháʼí Faith as one of four known religions and its scriptures are regarded as predicting the coming of Baháʼu'lláh (Kalki avatar). Krishna is included in the succession of Manifestations of God. The authenticity of the Hindu scriptures is seen as uncertain.

Zoroastrianism

Hinduism and Zoroastrianism share a common root in Proto-Indo-Iranian religion. Zoroastrianism in India shares more than a thousand year of history with the culture and people of India. The Zoroastrians of India are known as Parsis.

The "Council of Dharmic Faiths" (UK) regards Zoroastrianism, whilst not originating in the Indian subcontinent, also as a Dharmic religion.

Yezidism 
Recently, some people have found similarities between the customs of Hindus and Yezidis, suggesting that in ancient times they may have even been one people.  Recent comparisons and historical research between the two people have revealed many links that now thousands of Hindus and Yezidis believe that they are part of the same family.

Further reading
Panikkar, K. M. (1965). Asia and Western dominance. Millswood, S. Aust: Braille Writing Association of South Australia.
Swarup, Ram (1995). Hindu view of Christianity and Islam. Hinduism vis-à-vis Christianity and Islam (Indonesian: Pandangan Hindu atas Kristen dan Islam, French: [Foi et intolérance] : un regard hindou sur le christianisme et l'Islam)
Swarup, Ram (2015). Hinduism and monotheistic religions.
Swarup, Ram (1995). Pope John Paul II on Eastern religions and yoga: A Hindu-Buddhist rejoinder. 
Jain, S. (2010). Evangelical intrusions: [Tripura, a case study]. New Delhi: Rupa & Co.
Elst, Koenraad. (2002). Who is a Hindu?: Hindu revivalist views of Animism, Buddhism, Sikhism, and other offshoots of Hinduism. 
Goel, S. R. (2009). Catholic ashrams: Sannyasins or swindlers, with new appendices. New Delhi: Voice of India.
Goel, S. R. (2016). History of Hindu-Christian encounters, AD 304 to 1996.
Shourie, Arun (2006). Harvesting our souls: Missionaries, their design, their claims. New Delhi: Rupa.
Shourie, Arun (2006). Missionaries in India: Continuities, changes, dilemmas. New Delhi: Rupa.
Narain, Harsh (1997). Myths of composite culture and equality of religions.

See also

 Indian religions
 Eastern religions
 Religious harmony in India

References

External links
 Hinduism and Origins of Judaism and Christianity
 BBC - Islam and Hinduism's Blurred Lines